Everett's scops owl (Otus everetti) is an owl, endemic to the Philippines, belonging to the family of the typical owls Strigidae.  Everett's scops owls feed at night on insects. They live alone or in monogamous pairs. They breed throughout the year, laying clutches of 1 or 2 eggs.  They nest in tree hollows in forests of the Philippine lowlands. They are found on Bohol, Samar, Biliran, Leyte, Mindanao and Basilan. They were formerly classified as a subspecies of the Philippine scops owl.

References

Dickinson, E.C., R.S. Kennedy, and K.C. Parkes. 1991. The birds of the Philippines. An annotated check-list. British Ornithologists' Union Check-list number 12. British Ornithologists' Union, London.
Miranda, H.C., Jr., D.M. Brooks, and R.S. Kennedy. 2011. Phylogeny and taxonomic review of Philippine lowland scops owls (Strigiformes): parallel diversification of highland and lowland clades. Wilson Journal of Ornithology 123: 4441–454.

Everett's scops owl
Endemic birds of the Philippines
Birds of Mindanao
Fauna of Bohol
Fauna of Samar
Fauna of Biliran
Fauna of Leyte
Fauna of Basilan
Everett's scops owl
Everett's scops owl